Antolin may refer to:

Places
Antolin, Łódź Voivodeship, central Poland
Antolin, Biała Podlaska County, Lublin Voivodeship, eastern Poland
Antolin, Janów Lubelski County, Lublin Voivodeship, eastern Poland
, a village in Colonia Department, Uruguay

People
Antolin (name)

Other uses
, a German web-based programme for promotion of reading in schools
Grupo Antolin, a Spanish automotive interiors company